Flock of Dudes is a 2016 American comedy film directed by Bob Castrone. The film premiered at the LA Film Festival on June 13, 2015, and stars Chris D'Elia, Hannah Simone and Hilary Duff. Flock of Dudes is loosely based upon the experiences of the script writers. It was released in the United States on September 30, 2016.

Plot
Adam (Chris D'Elia) is a 30-something man child who lives a ridiculous lifestyle with his three lifelong friends. After he is evicted from the house they ruined together, and his ex starts dating a successful celebrity, Adam decides it is time to grow up by "breaking up" with his friends.

Cast

Production
Filming began on Flock of Dudes in June 2013 in Los Angeles and Whittier, California. Hannah Simone, Marc Maron, and Jeff Ross were named as participating in the film along with Blake Griffin. Lea Michele was temporarily attached to the film but withdrew from the project after the death of her boyfriend Cory Monteith. Flock of Dudes moved into post-production in August 2013.

Reception 
On review aggregator Rotten Tomatoes, the film holds an approval rating of 36% based on 11 reviews, with an average rating of 5.33/10.

References

External links
 
 

2016 comedy films
2016 films
American comedy films
Films shot in Los Angeles County, California
2016 directorial debut films
2010s English-language films
2010s American films